Papilio desmondi, the Desmond's green-banded swallowtail, is a butterfly of the family Papilionidae. It is found in Africa.

The larvae feed on Vepris eugeniifolia, other Vepris species, Clausena, Zanthoxylum, Calodendrum, and Citrus species.

Subspecies
Papilio desmondi desmondi (Chyulu Hills of south-eastern Kenya)
Papilio desmondi magdae Gifford, 1961 . (northern Tanzania)
Papilio desmondi teita van Someren, 1960  (south-eastern Kenya)
Papilio desmondi usambaraensis (Koçak, 1980)  (Tanzania, northern Malawi, north-eastern Zambia)

Description
The blue median band of the upper surface is somewhat narrower than in Papilio desmondi and the spot in the cell of the forewing reaches basad at most to vein 3.Forewing beneath with large yellowish submarginal spots in cellules 1 b—4. German and British East Africa. There are sharp nervular indentations at the margin of the blue band in the fore wing.

Taxonomy
Papilio desmondi belongs to a clade called the nireus species group with 15 members. The pattern is black with green or blue bands and spots and the butterflies, although called swallowtails lack tails with the exception of Papilio charopus and Papilio hornimani. The clade members are:

Papilio aristophontes Oberthür, 1897
Papilio nireus Linnaeus, 1758
Papilio charopus Westwood, 1843
Papilio chitondensis de Sousa & Fernandes, 1966
Papilio chrapkowskii Suffert, 1904
Papilio chrapkowskoides Storace, 1952
Papilio desmondi van Someren, 1939
Papilio hornimani Distant, 1879
Papilio interjectana Vane-Wright, 1995
Papilio manlius Fabricius, 1798
Papilio microps Storace, 1951
Papilio sosia Rothschild & Jordan, 1903
Papilio thuraui Karsch, 1900
Papilio ufipa Carcasson, 1961
Papilio wilsoni Rothschild, 1926

References

Carcasson, R.H. (1960). "The Swallowtail Butterflies of East Africa (Lepidoptera, Papilionidae)". Journal of the East Africa Natural History Society pdf Key to East Africa members of the species group, diagnostic and other notes and figures. (Permission to host granted by The East Africa Natural History Society)

External links

Butterflies described in 1939
desmondi